Darren Walsh (born 16 January 1989) is a British tennis player playing on the ATP Challenger Tour. On 18 June 2012 he reached his highest ATP singles ranking of 1377 and on 20 July 2015 reached his highest doubles ranking of 150.

ATP Challenger and ITF Futures finals

Doubles: 14 (9–5)

External links 
 
 

1989 births
Living people
English male tennis players
British male tennis players
Universiade medalists in tennis
Tennis people from Greater London
Universiade gold medalists for Great Britain
Universiade silver medalists for Great Britain
Medalists at the 2015 Summer Universiade